Sketches of Spain is an album by Miles Davis, recorded between November 1959 and March 1960 at the Columbia 30th Street Studio in New York City. An extended version of the second movement of Joaquín Rodrigo's Concierto de Aranjuez (1939) is included, as well as a piece called "Will o' the Wisp", from Manuel de Falla's ballet El amor brujo (1914–1915). Sketches of Spain is regarded as an exemplary recording of third stream, a musical fusion of jazz, European classical, and styles from world music.

Background

Davis' wife Frances Davis insisted he accompany her to a performance by flamenco dancer Roberto Iglesias. Inspired by the performance, Davis bought every flamenco album he could get at Colony Records shop in New York City.

The album pairs Davis with arranger and composer Gil Evans, with whom he had collaborated on several other projects, on a program of compositions largely derived from the Spanish folk tradition. Evans explained: [We] hadn't intended to make a Spanish album. We were just going to do the Concierto de Aranjuez. A friend of Miles gave him the only album in existence with that piece. He brought it back to New York and I copied the music off the record because there was no score. By the time we did that, we began to listen to other folk music, music played in clubs in Spain... So we learned a lot from that and it ended up being a Spanish album. The Rodrigo, the melody is so beautiful. It's such a strong song. I was so thrilled with that.

The folk songs in the album were inspired by recordings made by Alan Lomax in Galicia and Andalusia, which were released in 1955 by Columbia Masterworks.

Concierto de Aranjuez

The opening piece, taking up almost half the record, is an arrangement by Evans and Davis of the adagio movement of Concierto de Aranjuez, a concerto for guitar by the contemporary Spanish composer Joaquín Rodrigo. Following the faithful introduction of the concerto's guitar melody on flugelhorn, Evans' arrangement turns into a "quasi-symphonic, quasi-jazz world of sound", according to his biographer. The middle of the piece contains a "chorus" by Evans unrelated to the concerto but "echoed" in the other pieces on the album. The original melody then reappears in a darker mode.

Davis plays flugelhorn and later trumpet, attempting to connect the various settings musically. Davis commented at rehearsal, "The thing I have to do now is make things connect, make them mean something in what I play around it". Davis thought the concerto's adagio melody was "so strong" that "the softer you play it, the stronger it gets, and the stronger you play it, the weaker it gets", and Evans concurred.

According to Davis' biographer Chambers, the contemporary critical response to the arrangement was not surprising, especially given the scarcity of anything resembling a jazz rhythm in most of the piece. Martin Williams wrote that "the recording is something of a curiosity and a failure, as I think a comparison with any good performance of the movement by a classical guitarist would confirm". The composer Rodrigo was also not impressed, but royalties from the arrangement brought him "a lot of money", according to Evans.

Critical reception

In a contemporary review for DownBeat, Bill Mathieu hailed Sketches of Spain as one of the 20th century's most important musical works so far and a highly intellectual yet passionate record. He found Evans's compositions extremely well crafted and Davis's playing intelligently devised, concluding in his review, "if there is to be a new jazz, a shape of things to come, then this is the beginning." Replying to suggestions that Sketches of Spain was something other than jazz, Davis said "it's music, and I like it". In The Rolling Stone Album Guide (2004), J. D. Considine called it "a work of unparalleled grace and lyricism", while Q magazine said it "took orchestral jazz in a new direction". Robert Christgau was less enthusiastic about the record and recalled being a young listener when it was released: "In 1960 [it] catapulted Davis into the favor of the kind of man who reads Playboy and initiated in me one phase of the disillusionment with jazz that resulted in my return to rock and roll".

For Sketches of Spain, Evans and Davis won the 1961 Grammy Award for Best Jazz Composition of More Than Five Minutes Duration. The album was ranked number 358 on Rolling Stones list of the 500 greatest albums of all time. According to Acclaimed Music, it is the 393rd most frequently ranked record on critics' all-time lists.

Track listing

 Sides one and two were combined as tracks 1–5 on CD reissues.

Song title meanings
Concierto de Aranjuez was written about the gardens at the Royal Palace of Aranjuez. 
El amor brujo is often translated as "The Bewitched Love", and it is a ballet by Spanish composer Manuel de Falla. 
"The Pan Piper" refers to the instrument (pan flute) played by a pig's castrator and knife grinder and the melody he used to play when arriving to villages in Galicia. "Alborada" is a traditional folk style from Galicia.
"Solea" is a form of flamenco music.

Personnel

 Miles Davis – arranger, trumpet, flugelhorn
 Gil Evans – arranger, conductor
 Johnny Coles – trumpet
 Bernie Glow – trumpet
 Taft Jordan – trumpet
 Louis Mucci – trumpet
 Ernie Royal – trumpet
 John Barrows – French horn
 James Buffington – French horn
 Earl Chapin – French horn
 Tony Miranda – French horn
 Joe Singer – French horn
 Dick Hixon – trombone
 Frank Rehak – trombone
 Bill Barber – tuba
 Jimmy McAllister – tuba
 Danny Bank – bass clarinet
 Albert Block – flute
 Eddie Caine – flute
 Harold Feldman – clarinet, flute, oboe
 Romeo Penque – oboe
 Jack Knitzer – bassoon
 Paul Chambers – bass
 Jimmy Cobb – drums
 Elvin Jones – percussion
 José Mangual Sr. – percussion (on track 1)
 Elden "Buster" Bailey – percussion (tracks 2–5)
 Janet Putnam – harp

Certifications and sales

References

External links

 Sketches of Spain Legacy Edition at Myspace (streamed copy where licensed)

1960 albums
Albums arranged by Gil Evans
Albums conducted by Gil Evans
Albums produced by Teo Macero
Albums recorded at CBS 30th Street Studio
Columbia Records albums
Instrumental albums
Miles Davis albums
Classical albums by American artists
Orchestral jazz albums